The .300 Savage cartridge is a rimless, .30 caliber rifle cartridge developed by Savage Arms in 1920. It was designed to replace the less powerful .303 Savage in their popular Savage Model 1899 hammerless lever-action rifle, which they started to produce again as Model 99, as well as the new Savage Model 1920 bolt-action rifle.

Performance
Pressure level for the .300 Savage is set by SAAMI at 46,000 CUP.

See also
 .30-06 Springfield
 .303 Savage
 .308 Winchester
 Table of handgun and rifle cartridges

References

External links
 Savage 99 Web site
 C.I.P. TDCC sheet .300 Savage
 The .300 Savage by Chuck Hawks

300 Savage
.300 Savage
Savage Arms